Ernest Storey was an English professional footballer who played as a goalkeeper.

Career
Storey spent his early career with Hull City (for whom he made 3 league appearances) and Spennymoor United. He signed for Bradford City in December 1911, making 3 league appearances for the club, before signing for Swansea Town in August 1913. He later played for Blyth Spartans and Distillery.

Sources

References

Date of birth missing
Date of death missing
English footballers
Hull City A.F.C. players
Spennymoor United F.C. players
Bradford City A.F.C. players
Swansea City A.F.C. players
Blyth Spartans A.F.C. players
Lisburn Distillery F.C. players
English Football League players
Association football goalkeepers